La Granja VIP was a Chilean reality television and is the second season of The Farm. It was aired from May 10, 2005 to August 12, 2005 by Canal 13 and was produced by Promofilm. It was hosted by Sergio Lagos.

Finishing order

Nominations

External links
https://web.archive.org/web/20110707005849/http://lagranjavip.canal13.cl/

Chilean reality television series
The Farm (franchise)
2005 Chilean television series debuts
2005 Chilean television series endings